Antonio Maquilón Badaracco (29 November 1902 – 20 April 1984) was a Peruvian football defender who played for Peru in the 1930 FIFA World Cup. He also played for Sportivo Tarapacá Ferrocarril.

References

External links

FIFA profile

1902 births
1984 deaths
Footballers from Lima
Peruvian footballers
Peru international footballers
Association football defenders
1930 FIFA World Cup players
Atlético Chalaco footballers
Circolo Sportivo Italiano footballers